Khajoori Khas is a census town in North East district in the Indian state of Delhi.

Demographics
 India census, Khajoori Khas had a population of 45,090. Males constituted 54% of the population and females 46%. Khajoori Khas had an average literacy rate of 57%, lower than the national average of 59.5%: male literacy was 60%, and female literacy 44%. 20% of the population was under 6 years of age.

References

Cities and towns in North East Delhi district